This is a list of mayors of Bogotá from 1538 to 1570 and since 1910.

Encomenderos of Santa Fe de Bogotá (1538–1570) 
 Gonzalo Jiménez de Quesada, 1538–39
 Jerónimo de Lainza, 1539
 Juan de Arévalo, 1539–40
 Antonio Díaz de Cardoso, 1540–41
 Juan Tafur, 1541
 Juan Díaz Hidalgo, 1541–42
 Hernán Venegas Carrillo, 1542
 Juan de Céspedes, 1542–43
 Hernán Venegas Carrillo, 1543–44
 Juan Ruiz de Orejuela, 1544
 Gonzalo García Zorro, 1544–45
 Juan Ruiz de Orejuela, 1545
 Gonzalo García Zorro, 1545–46
 Juan de Céspedes, 1546
 Juan Tafur, 1546–47
 Pedro de Colmenares, 1547
 Juan Muñoz de Collantes, 1547–48
 Gonzalo García Zorro, 1548
 Juan Ruiz de Orejuela, 1548–50
 Juan de Avellaneda, 1550
 Gonzalo García Zorro, 1550–51
 Juan de Avellaneda, 1550–51
 Juan Ruiz de Orejuela, 1551
 Juan Muñoz de Collantes, 1551–52
 Juan Tafur, 1552
 Gonzalo Rodríguez de Ledesma, 1552–53
 Juan de Rivera, 1553
 Gonzalo García Zorro, 1553–54
 Juan Tafur, 1554
 Juan Ruiz de Orejuela, 1554–55
 Andrés López de Galarza, 1555
 Antonio Ruiz, 1555–56
 Gonzalo García Zorro, 1556
 Domingo Lozano, 1556–57
 Juan de Ortega, 1557
 Diego Rodríguez de Baldeno, 1557–58
 Antón de Olaya, 1558
 Gonzalo Rodríguez de Ledesma, 1558–59
 Juan Tafur, 1559
 Antonio Bermúdez, 1559–60
 Juan Ruiz de Orejuela, 1560
 Andrés de Molina, 1560–61
 Francisco de Figueredo, 1561
 Hernán Gómez de Castillejo, 1561
 Juan de Rivera, 1562
 Antonio Díaz Cardoso, 1562–63
 Alonso de Olaya, 1563
 Juan Ruiz de Orejuela, 1563–64
 Gonzalo García Zorro, 1564
 Andrés de Molina, 1564–65
 Juan Ruiz de Orejuela, 1565
 Gonzalo Rodríguez de Ledesma, 1565–66
 Juan de Penagos, 1566
 Gonzalo de León, 1566–67
 Antón de Olaya, 1567
 Antonio Díaz Cardoso, 1567–68
 Gonzalo de Ledesma, 1568
 Juan de Montalvo, 1568–69
 Cristóbal Gómez, 1569
 Cristóbal Ortiz Bernal, 1569
 Andrés de Molina, 1569–70

Mayors of Santa Fe de Bogotá 
 Eustaquio Galavís y Hurtado, 1770s & 1794 -

Municipal Mayors of Bogotá (1910–1954) 

 Javier Tobar Ahumada, 1910–1911
 Manuel María Mallarino, 1911–1913
 Emilio Cuervo Márquez, 1913–1914
 Andrés Marroquín Osorio, 1914–1917
 Raimundo Rivas, 1917
 Gerardo Arrubla, 1917–1918
 Santiago de Castro, 1918–1920
 Tadeo de Castro, 1920
 Cenón Escobar, 1920
 Ernesto Sánz de Santamaría, 1920–1925
 Leonidas Ojeda, 1925
 José Posada Tavera, 1925–1926
 José María Piedrahita, 1926–1929
 Luis Borrero Mercado, 1929
 Luis Augusto Cuervo, 1929
 Alfonso Robledo, 1929
 Hernando Carrizosa, 1929–1930
 Luis Carlos Páez, 1930
 Enrique Vargas Nariño, 1930–1931
 Francisco Umaña Bernal, 1931
 Enrique Vargas Nariño, 1931
 Luis Patiño Galvis, November 1931 – December 1933
 Alfonso Esguerra, December 1933 – March 1934
 Julio Pardo Dávila, March 1934 – January 1935
 Diego Montaña Cuéllar, January 1935 – February 1935
 Jorge Merchán, February 1935 – October 1935
 Carlos Arango Vélez, October 1935 – March 1936
 Francisco José Arévalo, March 1936 – June 1936
 Jorge Eliécer Gaitán, June 1936 – March 1937
 Gonzalo Restrepo, March 1937 – May 1937
 Manuel Rueda Vargas, May 1937 – March 1938
 Gustavo Santos, March 1938 – October 1938
 Germán Zea Hernández, October 1938 – April 1941
 Julio Pardo Dávila, May 1941 – August 1942
 Carlos Sánz de Santamaría, August 1942 – March 1944
 Jorge Soto del Corral, March 1944 – November 1944
 Gabriel Paredes, November 1944 – January 1945
 Juan Pablo Llinás, January 1945 – June 1945
 Ramón Muñoz Toledo, June 1945 – September 1946
 Juan Salgar Martín, October 1946 – March 1947
 Francisco José Arévalo, April 1947 – March 1948
 Manuel de Vengoechea Mier, March 1948 – April 1948
 Fernando Mazuera Villegas, April 1948 – October 1948
 Carlos Reyes Posada, October 1948 – December 1948
 Fernando Mazuera Villegas, December 1948 – May 1949
 Carlos Reyes Posada, May 1949 – June 1949
 Gregorio Obregón, June 1949 – September 1949
 Marco Tulio Amaya, September 1949 – October 1949
 Santiago Trujillo, October 1949 – July 1952
 Manuel Briceño, July 1952 – June 1953
 José Rodríguez Mantilla, June 1953 – July 1953
 Col. Julio Cervantes, July 1953 – September 1954

Mayors of the Special District of Bogotá (1954–1991)

Principal mayors of the Capital District of Santa Fe de Bogotá (1991–1998)

Principal mayors of the Capital District of Bogotá (1998–present)
Elected by popular vote since 1988, for a two-year term, without immediate reelection. Change in 2004 for a 3- to 4-year term, without immediate reelection.

See also 

 Superior Mayor of Bogotá
 History of Bogotá
 Timeline of Bogotá

References 

 
Mayors, Bogota